Terry and Linda Fuller Track & Field Complex is a multi-use stadium in Lubbock, Texas on the campus of Texas Tech University where it serves as home to Red Raider track and field. Formerly, it was also the home of the women's soccer team before they moved to the John Walker Soccer Complex. The stadium seats 3,500.

Usage
The 2013 Big 12 Conference Outdoor Track & Field Championship was hosted at the Terry and Linda Fuller Track & Field Complex on May 16–18, 2014.

References

External links

 Facilities at Texas Tech athletics

Athletics (track and field) venues in Texas
College track and field venues in the United States
Sports venues in Lubbock, Texas
Texas Tech Red Raiders sports venues
Texas Tech Red Raiders women's soccer venues